The Central District of Eshtehard County is in Alborz province, Iran. At the 2006 census, the district's population (as Eshtehard District of Karaj County, Tehran province) was 23,601 in 6,716 households. At the latest census in 2016, the population of the district had increased to 35,250 in 10,911 households, by which time the district had separated from the county and become a part of recently established Alborz province as a county.

References 

Eshtehard County

Districts of Alborz Province

Populated places in Alborz Province

Populated places in Eshtehard County